Quand on crie au loup is a 2019 French comedy film directed by Marilou Berry.

Cast
 Noé Wodecki as Victor Bogomil
 Gérard Jugnot as Joseph Bogomil
 Constance Ollé as Lorraine
 Marilou Berry as Romane
 Bérengère Krief as Pauline Pividale
 Nicolas Wanczycki as Wallace
 Thomas Vandenberghe as Jasper
 Julien Boisselier as Monsieur Martin
 Anne Girouard as Madame Martin
 Gustave Klépal as Georges

Production
Marilou Berry was 8 month pregnant when she direct the movie. She shot her scenes as an actress first. She was on a wheelchair on the set for the last weeks.

References

External links

2019 films
Films directed by Marilou Berry
French comedy films
2010s French films